The 1926–27 Army Cadets men's ice hockey season was the 24th season of play for the program. The team was coached by Ray Marchand in his 4th season.

Season
With more than half of the previous year's team having graduated, coach Marchand had his work cut out for him in rebuilding the team. With 12 games on the schedule, Army was hoping to improve upon their poor record from '26, however, the weather was particularly harsh this season. High temperatures and inclement conditions, including snow, rain and hail, ruined what could have been a decent season for the Cadets. In the end, Army had to cancel 8 games.

With so many new faces, Army was outplayed in their first game of the season and soundly beaten by MIT, 0–7. Delays and cancellations forced the team to the sidelines for over three weeks before their next match but even through the difficulties, they performed well against one of the top teams in the country. While the ice was soft, the Cadets weren't and Army recovered from an early 1–3 deficit to tie Clarkson by the end of the second period. McNamara gave the team a lead in the final frame but they couldn't stop Tech from equaling and the two needed overtime to settle the match. The two fought furiously to score for the first 4 minutes of the extra period, unfortunately it was Clarkson who netted a goal. The Greens then pulled back and played defense for the final 6 minutes, preventing Army from getting a good shot at tying the game. Amherst arrived in town a few weeks later and the two played an even game. they were so equally matched that after 2 overtime periods neither could net a winner so they had to settle for a tie.

For Army's final game of the year, they travelled north to Kingston to face the Royal Military College Paladins. Their Canadian counterparts kept their series winning streak alive with another easy victory, though Army did play better than the final score would indicate.

This season had one of the fewest number of games for Army's hockey team in its history and would serve as an impetus for the academy to build a more permanent home for the program.

Joseph Cox served as the team's manager with John Oakes as his assistant.

Roster

Standings

Schedule and Results

|-
!colspan=12 style=";" | Regular Season

References

Army Black Knights men's ice hockey seasons
Army
Army
Army
Army